In investment portfolio construction, an investor or analyst is faced with determining which asset classes, such as domestic fixed income, domestic equity, foreign fixed income, and foreign equity, to invest in and what proportion of the total portfolio should be of each asset class. Harry Markowitz (1959) first described a method for constructing a portfolio with optimal risk/return characteristics. His portfolio optimization method finds the minimum risk portfolio with a given expected return. Because the Markowitz or Mean-Variance Efficient Portfolio is calculated from the sample mean and covariance, which are likely different from the population mean and covariance, the resulting investment portfolio may allocate too much weight to assets with better estimated than true risk/return characteristics. To account for the uncertainty of the sample estimates, a financial analyst can create many alternative efficient frontiers based on resampled versions of the data. Each resampled dataset will result in a different set of Markowitz efficient portfolios. These efficient frontiers of portfolios can then be averaged to create a resampled efficient frontier. The appropriate compromise between the investor's Risk aversion and desired return will then guide the financial analyst to choose a portfolio from the set of resampled efficient frontier portfolios. Since such a portfolio is different from the Markowitz efficient portfolio it will have suboptimal risk/return characteristics with respect to the sample mean and covariance, but optimal characteristics when averaged over the many possible values of the unknown true mean and covariance. (Michaud, 1998)  Resampled Efficiency is covered by U. S. patent #6,003,018, patent pending worldwide. New Frontier Advisors, LLC, has exclusive worldwide licensing rights.

References 

 Markowitz, H. 1959. Portfolio Selection: Efficient Diversification of Investments. New York: Wiley, 2nd ed. Cambridge, MA: Basil Blackwell, 1991.
Michaud, R., and Michaud, R. 1998. Efficient Asset Management: A practical Guide to Stock Portfolio Optimization and Asset Allocation. Boston: Harvard Business School Press. 2nd ed. Oxford: Oxford University Press, 2008. .
Sharpe, W. et al. (2009). CFA Portfolio Management, Level III, Volume 3, pages 261 & 262. Pearson Publishing. .

Investment